José Gottardi Cristelli, S.D.B. (21 September 1923, in Baselga di Pinè, Trentino – 7 March 2005, in Montevideo) was a Uruguayan cleric.

He was ordained on 15 October 1950 as a Salesian of Don Bosco. On 1 March 1972 he was appointed titular bishop of Bellicastrum and auxiliary bishop of Mercedes; three years later, auxiliary bishop of Montevideo. On 5 June 1985 he was appointed Archbishop of Montevideo; he retired in 1998.

References

External links 
 

1923 births
2005 deaths
People from Trentino
Salesian bishops
Bishops appointed by Pope Paul VI
20th-century Roman Catholic archbishops in Uruguay
Uruguayan Roman Catholic archbishops
Roman Catholic bishops of Mercedes
Roman Catholic archbishops of Montevideo
Italian emigrants to Uruguay